Private Party is the eighth studio album by Freddie Jackson. It was released by Scotti Bros. Records on February 28, 1995. The album produced the top 25 R&B single "Rub Up Against You," produced by Gerald Levert and Edwin Nicholas.

Critical reception

Allmusic editor Ed Hogan wrote that most of the material on Private Party falls "in the 'let's shower together' category, though it must be pointed out that the content never goes into the overly graphic area of a lot of modern R&B [...] Freddie Jackson's romantic balladeering is, for the most part, not the kind of material you would find at the top of the charts these days. And that's a shame."

Track listing

Personnel and credits 
Musicians

 Freddie Jackson – lead and backing vocals 
 Barry J. Eastmond – keyboards (1, 4, 6-9), drum programming (1, 4, 6-9), arrangements (1, 4, 6-9), organ (7)
 Edwin "Tony" Nicholas – keyboards (2), keyboard programming (2), drums (2), sequencing (2), arrangements (2)
 Marvin "Chanz" Parkman – keyboards (3), drum programming (3), sequencing (3), backing vocals (3), arrangements (3)
 Zack Harmon – keyboards (5), bass (5), vocal arrangements (5)
 Christopher Troy – keyboards (5), Rhodes (5), drum programming (5), vocal arrangements (5)
 Herb Middleton – keyboards (8), drum programming (8), arrangements (8)
 Yasha Barjona – all instruments (10), backing vocals (10), arrangements (10)
 DejI Coker – saxophone solo (5)
 Gordon Chambers – backing vocals (1, 4)
 Gerald Levert – backing vocals (2), arrangements (2)
 Sue Ann Carwell – backing vocals (5)
 T.C. – backing vocals (5), vocal arrangements (5)
 Curtis King, Jr. – backing vocals (6, 8)
 Sharon Bryant – backing vocals (7)
 B.J. Nelson – backing vocals (7)
 Angel Rogers – backing vocals (9)
 Jolyon Skinner – backing vocals (9)
 Michael Christian – backing vocals (10)

Production

 Barry J. Eastmond – producer (1, 4, 6-9), engineer (1, 4, 6-9)
 Gerald Levert – producer (2)
 Edwin "Tony" Nicholas – producer (2)
 Marvin "Chanz" Parkman – producer (3)
 Zack Harmon – producer (5), engineer (5)
 Christopher Troy – producer (5), engineer (5)
 Yasha Barjona – producer (10)
 Michael Christian – associate producer (10)
 Kevin L. Evans – executive producer
 Beau Huggins – executive producer, A&R direction
 Freddie Jackson – co-executive producer, A&R direction
 Mark Partis – engineer (1, 4, 6-9), mixing (1, 4, 8, 9)
 Stan Wallace – engineer (1, 4, 6-9), mixing (6, 7)
 Axel Niehaus – engineer (2, 3, 5, 10), mixing (3, 10)
 Ron Shaffer – engineer (2), mixing (2)
 Ken Duro Ifill – engineer (3, 10)
 Jason Vogel – mixing (5)
 Louis Alfred III – engineer (10)
 Greg Gasperino – assistant engineer (2)
 Aman Junaid – assistant engineer (3)
 Ann Mincieli – mix assistant (3)
 Tony Cuestas – mix assistant (5), assistant engineer (10)
 Sean Coffey – assistant engineer (10)
 Steve Souder – mix assistant (10)
 Tony Dawsey – mastering 
 Michelle Meena – production coordinator 
 Zack Vaz – production coordinator
 Jimmy "Mac" MacNeal – coordination assistant
 Missy Sheire – coordination assistant
 Joel Sylvain – coordination assistant 
 Doug Haverty – art direction, design 
 Carl Studna – photography 
 Hush Management – management 
 Anne Thomas – management administrator 

Studios
 Recorded at East Bay Recording (Tarrytown, NY); Platinum Island Studios and Phat Tracks Recording Studios (New York, NY); On The Way Studios (Cleveland, OH); Our Own Studios (Los Angeles, CA).
 Mixed at Electric Lady Studios, Axis Studios and Quad Sound Studios (New York, NY); BearTracks Studios (Suffern, NY); Our Own Studios (Los Angeles, CA).
 Mastered at Masterdisk (New York, NY).

Charts

References

External links

1995 albums
Freddie Jackson albums